"Miss Susie had a steamboat", also known as "Hello Operator", "Miss Suzy", "Miss Lucy", and many other names, is the name of an American schoolyard rhyme in which each verse leads up to a rude word or profanity which is revealed in the next verse as part of an innocuous word or phrase. Originally used as a jump-rope rhyme, it is now more often sung alone or as part of a clapping game. Hand signs sometimes accompany the song, such as pulling on the bell in the first verse or making a phone gesture in the second.

This song is sometimes combined or confused with "Miss Lucy had a baby", which is sung to the same tune and also served as a jump-rope song. That song developed from verses of much older (and cruder) songs which were most commonly known as "Bang Bang Rosie" in Britain, "Bang Away Lulu" in Appalachia, and "My Lula Gal" in the West. The variants including a woman with an alligator purse urging the baby's mother to vote have been seen as a reference to Susan B. Anthony, an American suffragette and wife, and may be responsible for the steamboat owner's most common name today.

Structure 
The rhyme is arranged in quatrains, with an A-B-C-B rhyme scheme. The rhyme is organized by its meter, a sprung rhythm in trimeter. Accentual verse (including sprung rhythm) is a common form in English folk verse, including nursery rhymes and jump-rope rhymes. The rhyme approaches taboo words, only to cut them off and modify them with an enjambment. It shares much of the same melody as the 1937 "The Merry-Go-Round Broke Down" used by Warner Bros. as the theme to their Looney Tunes cartoons.

History 

The song has developed many variations over an extended period, as is common for such rhymes. Even 21st-century versions, however, typically preserve long-outdated references to the dangerousness of 19th-century steamers and to the need for a switchboard operator to manually connect a telephone call.

The earliest recorded version—about a girl named Mary—appears among the vaudeville jokes collected by Ed Lowry during his career in the 1910s, '20s, and '30s, although versions about Robert Fulton, inventor of the steamboat) and Lulu (the star of "Bang Bang Lulu") may record older traditions. The Lulu tradition—including "Miss Lucy had a baby"—already record enjambed double entendres during the World Wars, but the first version of this song known to have done so—versions about Fulton and a girl named Helen—date to the 1950s.

Later versions developed by embellishment: adding, removing, and adjusting stanzas involving kissing, boys in bathrooms, a little black boy, bras, King Arthur, questions and lies, German spies, raving aunts, and so forth. While the initial stanzas were fairly stable by the late 20th century, the folklorist Josepha Sherman noted that two unrelated children in 1990s New York took the change from "Miss Lucy" to "Ms. Lucy" for granted. An adaptation—"Miss Lucy had some leeches"—has been recorded by Emilie Autumn and another—"Mrs. Landers was a health nut"—featured in the South Park episode "Something You Can Do with Your Finger".

Lyrics
Numerous versions exist, varying across time and regionally.  One version is:

Miss Susie had a steamboat,
The steamboat had a bell,
Miss Susie went to heaven,
The steamboat went to...

Hello Operator,
Please dial Number 9,
And if you disconnect me,
I'll kick you from...

Behind the 'frigerator,
There lay a piece of glass,
Miss Susie sat upon it,
And cut her little...

Ask me no more questions,
I’ll tell you no more lies,
The boys are in the bathroom,
Zipping up their...

Flies are in the backyard,
The bees are in the park,
Miss Susie and her boyfriend
Are kissing in the D-A-R-K
Dark, dark, dark

D-A-R-K D-A-R-K dark dark dark 

Dark is like a movie, 
A movie’s like a show. 
A show is like a TV screen, 
And that is all I know

I know I know my mother, 
I know I know my pa. 
I know I know my sister 
With the forty acre bra. 

Additional common lyrics 

Another version, from the early 1900s, begins as follows:

Mary had a steamboat
The steamboat had a bell
Mary went to Heaven
And the steamboat went Toot Toot."Tuyere Blasts". Iowa Transit. October 1924.

See also
 "Bang Bang Lulu"
 JibJab#The JibJab Year in Review 2008
 "K-I-S-S-I-N-G"
 "Miss Lucy had a baby"
 "Mary Mack"

References

Children's street culture
Clapping games
Playground songs
Vaudeville songs
American folk songs
Songs about fictional female characters
Traditional children's songs
Songwriter unknown
Year of song unknown